Ziad Abu Amr (born 1950) is a Palestinian politician, author, and member of the Palestinian Legislative Council. He currently serves as the first deputy prime minister and is a member (independent) of the PLO Executive Committee. From 18 March 2007 to 17 June 2007, he was Foreign Minister of the Palestinian National Authority. On 6 June 2013, Ziad Abu-Amr was appointed as Deputy Prime Minister of the Palestinian Authority by President Mahmoud Abbas.

Background
Born in Gaza City in 1950, Abu Amr later attended Damascus University in Syria, where he earned a bachelor's degree in English literature and language. He obtained a master's and doctorate degree in comparative politics from Georgetown University in Washington, D.C. After working as a teacher in Bahrain, Oman, and Syria, he began teaching political science at Birzeit University in Ramallah in 1985.

Political career
Running as an independent candidate in the 1996 Palestinian general election, he won a seat in the Palestinian Legislative Council (PLC) representing Gaza City. During this period, he was chairman of the PLC's political committee.

He was re-elected in legislative elections that took place on 25 January 2006, winning 55,748 votes.

From April to October 2003, he was Minister of Culture in the government of Prime Minister (now President) Mahmoud Abbas.

After a period of factional violence in the Palestinian territories in early 2007, the Hamas-led government resigned on 15 February. Prime Minister Ismail Haniyeh formed a new national unity government with Abu Amr as foreign minister. The cabinet was approved by the PLC and its members took office on 18 March.

On 6 June 2013, Ziad Abu-Amr was appointed as Deputy Prime Minister of the Palestinian Authority by President Mahmoud Abbas.

He is associated with many political associations, including the Palestine Center in Washington D.C., the Palestinian Council on Foreign Relations, and MIFTAH, a Palestinian civil rights organization.

Political ideology and views
Abu Amr is considered a reform-minded politician and part of the "young guard" of Palestinian leaders. He has, at times, been critical of the Palestinian Authority administration and security services. He has mediated talks between the two main Palestinian factions, Hamas and Fatah, and is widely respected by both groups.

A proponent of democracy and democratic elections, he has been a supporter of representation for opposition groups such as Hamas and Islamic Jihad, claiming that they would be held more accountable for their actions.

Miscellaneous
Abu Amr is married and the father of five children. Currently, he lives in Ramallah, West Bank. He has published several books, the most well-known being Islamic Fundamentalism in the West Bank and Gaza: Muslim Brotherhood and Islamic Jihad.

See also
Palestinian National Unity Government of March 2007
Palestinian Authority Governments of 2013
Palestinian Unity Government of June 2014

References

External links
Palestine Center 
Palestinian Council on Foreign Relations
MIFTAH

1950 births
Living people
Georgetown University Graduate School of Arts and Sciences alumni
People from Gaza City
Government ministers of the State of Palestine
Members of the 1996 Palestinian Legislative Council
Members of the 2006 Palestinian Legislative Council
Foreign ministers of the Palestinian National Authority
Government ministers of the Palestinian National Authority
Palestinian diplomats
Damascus University alumni
Members of the Palestinian Central Council
Academic staff of Birzeit University
Members of the Executive Committee of the Palestine Liberation Organization